Mostafa Meshaal may refer to:
 Mostafa Meshaal (basketball)
 Mostafa Meshaal (footballer)